The A815 is a major road in Argyll and Bute, Scotland. It passes beside three lochs, while its final stretch is along the Firth of Clyde.

Course
The road begins as a T-junction with the A83, immediately east of Ardkinglas Woodland Garden. The first section of its course is in a southerly direction, along the eastern shores of Loch Fyne. Between Creggans and Strachur, the road turns east at the A886.

The next loch it meets is Loch Eck, again on the eastern side. It passes through Benmore (and beside Benmore Botanic Garden) and Uig en route to Ardbeg, below Puck's Glen to the north.

After a few sweeping curves, just north of Dalinlongart the road crosses the Little Eachaig River, turns south, and continues beside the northern end of the Holy Loch on its western shores   

In Sandbank, at a T-junction with the A885 High Road (which leads to and from the northern end of Dunoon and links up with the A815 at East Bay), the road turns left towards the Holy Loch Marina. At Lazaretto Point, in Ardnadam, the road turns sharply to the southeast and continues beside the Holy Loch's Ardnadam Bay

At the mouth of the Holy Loch, at the western shores of the Firth of Clyde the road turns southeast as it leads through Hunters Quay. As Alexandra Parade, the road continues through Hunters Quay and Kirn.

En route to Dunoon's East Bay, the road passes several roads that lead up and down the hill perpendicular to the Holy Loch. They are: Kirn Brae, Stewart Street, Clyde Street and Dhalling Road. Several others, not mentioned here, are cul-de-sacs.

Still Alexandra Parade, the road crosses a roundabout shared with John Street (the southern terminus of the A885 it meets in Sandbank), then passes Church Street, Moir Street and the eastern end of Argyll Street.

The road continues past Dunoon Pier and crosses the roundabout overlooked by the Highland Mary statue. As Wellington Street, it then sweeps a few hundred feet inland, on a pronounced curve to the east, forming junctions with Park Avenue, Kirk Street, Castle Street, Jane Street, Hillfoot Street, Victoria Road, Auchamore Road, (another) Clyde Street, William Street and Victoria Parade.

At West Bay, after passing the western end of Victoria Parade, the road turns south again as Pier Esplanade, before passing through Bullwood, Ardhallow and Innellan. 

Name

Its name changes several times over its course (from north to south):

Shore Road (Ardnadam to Sandbank)
Marine Parade (Kirn to Hunters Quay)
Alexandra Parade (from Argyll Street to Kirn)
Pier Esplanade (from East Bay, Dunoon, to Argyll Street, Dunoon)
Wellington Street (through Dunoon)
Bullwood Road (between Innellan and West Bay, Dunoon)
Shore Road (between Toward and Innellan)

Notable building and structures

The following buildings, structures or sites of interest stand (or formerly stood) beside the road (from north to south):

Coylet Inn, a 17th-century coaching inn
Whistlefield Inn
Benmore Botanic Garden
Lazaretto Point War Memorial
Hafton House, Hunters Quay
Royal Marine Hotel, Hunters Quay
Hunters Quay Hotel, Hunters Quay
Queen's Hotel, Kirn
Kirn & Sandbank Parish Church, Dunoon
Dunoon Pier, Dunoon
Highland Mary statue, Dunoon
Laudervale, Dunoon (the now-demolished former home of Sir Harry Lauder)

Viewpoints

References

External links
A815 at roadtrafficstats.uk

Roads in Scotland
Transport in Argyll and Bute